Åker's Canal (Swedish: Åkers kanal), previous known as Åkersström, is a waterway in Sweden. It was originally a natural river, but was renamed after having been regulated in the 19th Century to be used as a canal.

References

Rivers of Stockholm County